Cádiz is a province of southern Spain, in the southwestern part of the autonomous community of Andalusia. It is the southernmost part of mainland Spain, as well as the southernmost part of continental Europe.

It is bordered by the Spanish provinces of Huelva, Seville, and Málaga, as well as the Atlantic Ocean, the Mediterranean Sea, the Strait of Gibraltar and the British overseas territory of Gibraltar.

Its capital is the city of Cádiz, which has a population of 114,244. As of 2021, the largest city is Jerez de la Frontera with 212,801 inhabitants. Algeciras, which surpassed Cádiz with 122,982 inhabitants is the second most populated city. The entire province had a population of 1,245,960 (as of 2021), of whom about 600,000 live in the Bay of Cádiz area (including Jerez), making it the third most populous province in Andalusia. Its population density is 167.93 per square kilometre.

Political and traditional subdivisions (comarcas)

The province encompasses 44 municipalities; besides its capital, other important cities are Jerez and Algeciras.  (See the list of municipalities in Cádiz.)  According to a roster developed by the Council of Tourism and Sport of Andalusia on 27 March 2003, there are officially six traditional or touristic comarcas (provincial areas or counties) in the Province of Cádiz:
 Bahía de Cádiz (Bay of Cádiz)
 Campiña de Jerez (Countryside of Jerez)
 Campo de Gibraltar (Countryside of Gibraltar)
 Bajo Guadalquivir (Lower Guadalquivir, or Northwest Coast, Costa Noroeste)
 La Janda
 Sierra de Cádiz (Cádiz Mountains)

Bay of Cádiz (Bahía de Cádiz)
This area comprises towns and cities on the shores of the Bay of Cádiz on the west-central coast of the province:
 Cádiz
 Chiclana
 El Puerto de Santa María
 Puerto Real
 San Fernando

Campiña de Jerez (Countryside of Jerez)
This fertile area only includes two municipalities, both large in area:
 Jerez de la Frontera
 San José del Valle

Campo de Gibraltar (Countryside of Gibraltar)
The towns that extend into the rural hinterlands north of Gibraltar are:
 Algeciras
 Jimena de la Frontera
 Castellar de la Frontera
 San Roque
 La Línea de la Concepción
 Los Barrios
 Tarifa

Bajo Guadalquivir (Northwest Coast; also called Costa Noroeste)
The towns of this area called the "Bajo Guadalquivir" (lower Guadalquivir valley), are:
 Chipiona
 Rota
 Sanlúcar de Barrameda
 Trebujena

La Janda
Towns included in La Janda, an area in the southwestern part of the province, are:
 Alcalá de los Gazules
 Barbate
 Benalup-Casas Viejas
 Conil de la Frontera
 Medina Sidonia
 Paterna de Rivera
 Vejer de la Frontera

Sierra de Cádiz (Cádiz Mountains)
Towns included in the Cádiz Mountains area, in the northeastern part of the province, include:
 Alcalá del Valle
 Algar
 Algodonales
 Arcos de la Frontera
 Benaocaz
 Bornos
 El Bosque
 El Gastor
 Espera
 Grazalema
 Olvera
 Prado del Rey
 Puerto Serrano
 Setenil de las Bodegas
 Torre Alháquime
 Ubrique
 Villaluenga del Rosario
 Villamartín
 Zahara de la Sierra

Population
The historical population is given in the following chart:

Climate
The entire province of Cádiz has a Mediterranean climate, mostly Köppen Csa but also Csb in high altitude areas. Large differences in summer temperatures exist between the three official stations in Cádiz, Jerez, and Tarifa depending on position relative to the coastline. Tarifa is exceptionally mild for such a southerly place in Spain, meanwhile winter temperatures are mild throughout the province with less difference between localities than in summer. This is comparable to much cloudier climates further north in Europe, in spite of the high number of sunshine hours in the province. The Cádiz region is also much wetter than the arid Almería province further east in Andalusia.

Economy

In 2014 the unemployment rate was 42%, the highest in the country.
The main industry is tourism, mainly from non-coastal Spanish cities, Germany and the UK. Its once-important shipbuilding industry (Astilleros) is now in crisis due to competition from South Korea and China. There are factories of Airbus and Delphi. It also exports sherry as well as alimentary products.

Primary sector
 Sherry production
 John Harvey & Sons in Jerez de la Frontera
 Gonzalez Byass
 Olive groves
 Fishing Ports, as in Cádiz and Algeciras.
 Cork products from the Alcornocales cork-oak forests

Major industrial facilities
 Navantia
 Airbus
 CASA
 Delphi
 Ford
 Cepsa
 Lufthansa CityLine
 Endesa
 Acerinox

Tourism

Beaches
The province of Cádiz has many kilometres of beaches and (as of 2005) the highest number of Blue Flags of all coastal provinces in Europe.

Some of these beaches are relatively wild and far from big urban areas.  One of the attractions of the area is its contrast to the mass tourism on the Mediterranean coast. There are extensive nature reserves in the region and the unspoilt feel of the area is heightened by the presence of wild animals including cows and horses on many stretches of beach.

The Costa de la Luz has traditionally been a popular destination for Spaniards wanting to enjoy the beach while avoiding the stifling heat of the Mediterranean Coast, although until recently this largely unspoilt Atlantic coastline was little known to foreign visitors. One of the factors that brought the region to the attention of foreign holidaymakers was the growing realisation that its Southern reaches are one of the world's best locations for wind sports.

Tarifa, located on the Strait of Gibraltar at the southernmost point of mainland Europe, has become Europe's foremost kitesurfing destination due to the area's unique wind phenomena, reliably sunny summer weather and the variety of beaches at locations such as Los Canos de Meca, Bolonia, Punta Paloma and, most famously, Playa de Los Lances where in the summer months you will often see over 1,000 kites in the air. The local economy has benefited significantly from the wind sport explosion: there are more than 50 kite schools in Tarifa and hundreds of shops, bars and hotels serving the many thousands of kitesurfers who visit every year.

Notable beaches:
 Playa La Barrosa in Chiclana de la Frontera
 Playa La Victoria in Cádiz
 Playa de Levante in El Puerto de Santa María
 Playa de Bolonia in Tarifa
 Playa de Camposoto in San Fernando
 Los Canos de Meca
 Playa de Los Lances in Tarifa

Culture
 Carnival of Cádiz
 Feria de Jerez
 Semana Santa in all municipalities of the Province
 Horse racing in Sanlúcar de Barrameda
 Circuito Permanente de Jerez
 White Towns of Andalusia
 Ruta del Toro

Nature

Doñana National Park

Doñana National Park is one of two national parks in the autonomous community of Andalusia. A small area of the park extends into Cádiz Province, just north of Sanlucar de Barrameda and on the south bank of the Rio Guadalquivir. This area is primarily  marismas. The public have access to a recreational area and a short walking trail. There is no direct access to the bulk of the park that lies on the north bank of the river in the provinces of Seville and Huelva.

Natural parks

Bahía de Cádiz Natural Park

100 km2, located at the mouth of the Guadalete river, consists of marshland, beaches, reed and sand dunes.
Bird watching. Sailing, windsurfing, hiking.
(Ocean) Pine. Many types of shrubs and bushes.
Gannet solan goose, stork, cormorant, great crested grebe, (sea)gull, flamingo, tern, sea eagle, avocet.

La Breña y Marismas del Barbate Natural Park

37.97 km2, high cliff rock formations covered by pine trees.
Bird watching, archeological and botanical excursions, diving, windsurfing, sailing, hiking.
Strandpine, black juniper tree, black spruce, juniper, small palm tree, rosemary.
Herring gull, chaffinch, greenfinch, cattle egret, little egret, crested tit, woodpecker, kestrel, peregrine falcon.

La Doñana Natural Park

This natural park is shared by three provinces, Cádiz, Huelva and Seville.  It is an area to the east and northeast of the national park.
Home of the Iberian lynx, a protected species.

Los Alcornocales Natural Park

Information center in Alcalá de los Gazules; visitors centers in Algeciras and Cortes de la Frontera (Málaga).
1,700.25 km2 in area.
Low mountain range, densely covered by cork oak trees ("Alcornoques").
Bird watching, archeological and botanical excursions, hiking, mountainbiking, speleology.
Cork oak, olive tree, gall oak, pink rock rose, small palm tree, alder, rhododendron, holly, bracken (fern), cherry tree, laurel.
Sparrow hawk, short-toed snake eagle, booted eagle, goshawk, eagle owl, tawny owl, culture, kestrel, peregrine falcon, wild boar, deer, weasel, (sea)otter, wildcat, mongoose.

Sierra de Grazalema Natural Park

Administration in El Bosque; visitors' center in El Bosque.
516.95 km2 in area.
Limestone formation, transformed to ravines, declines and caves. Large colonies of Spanish fir ("pinsapo").
Bird watching, archeological and botanical excursions.
Hiking, climbing, mountainbiking, speleology, paragliding.
Spanish fir, cork oak, holm oak, gall oak, carob, oleaster.
Imperial eagle, golden eagle, fish hawk, vulture, Egyptian vulture, mountain goat, deer, mongoose, (sea)otter, fox.

Straits of Gibraltar Natural Park

Is the most meridional national park of Europe.
Its location at the southernmost point of mainland Spain, and of mainland Europe, at the point where the Atlantic Ocean and the Mediterranean Sea meet in the Strait of Gibraltar, places it on the migratory route for many birds.

Natural reserves

There are eight natural reserves in the province: Complejo Endorreico de Chiclana, Complejo Endorreico de Espera, Complejo Endorreico de Puerto Real, Complejo Endorreico del Puerto de Santa María, Laguna de Medina, Lagunas de las Canteras y el Tejón, Laguna de la Paja, and Peñón de Zaframagón (which straddles the border with the province of Seville.)

Natural sites

There are seven natural sites in the province: Cola del Embalse de Arcos, Cola del Embalse de Bornos, Estuario del Río Guadiaro, Isla del Trocadero, Marismas de Sancti Petri, Marismas del Río Palmones, and Playa de Los Lances.

Parques Periurbanos: Pinares y Dunas de San Antón La Suara La Barrosa

Natural monuments

There are five natural monuments in the province: Corrales de Rota, Duna de Bolonia, Punta del Boquerón, Tómbolo de Trafalgar, and Escarpes del Río Trejo en Setenil.

Transportation

Roads
 Autovía A-4
 Autovía A-7
 Autovía A-381
 N-340
 Autovía A-48

Airports
 Jerez Airport

Railroads
 Cádiz-Seville Line
 Cercanías Cádiz
 Algeciras-Granada Line

Ports
 Port of Algeciras
 Port of Cádiz
The main ways to enter the province are by road from Seville or Malaga and by the Jerez Airport.

Notable sports teams

Football
 Cádiz CF in the LaLiga. (LFP)
 Real Balompédica Linense in the Segunda División B.
 CD San Fernando in the Segunda División B.
 Algeciras CF in the Tercera División.
 Racing Club Portuense in the Tercera División.
 Xerez CD in the Tercera División.

Rugby Union
 CR Atlético Portuense in the División de Honor B de Rugby.

Notes and references

See also 
 List of Bienes de Interés Cultural in Cádiz

External links
 Grazalema Natural Park tourist information in Spanish, English, French and German
 Excma. Diputación Provincial de Cádiz
 Official Website of Tourism in the Province of Cádiz
Libro de Estilo de Canal Sur (anexo 4, pg. 417, comarcas andaluzas). Listado comarcal definido por la Consejería de Turismo y Deporte de la Junta de Andalucía.
  Bahía de Cádiz Natural Park
  Del Estrecho Natural Park
  Doñana Natural Park
  La Breña y Marismas del Barbate Natural Park
  Los Alcornocales Natural Park
  Grazalema Natural Park
 bajoguadalquivir.org
 Google Maps satellite view
 YasHan Gallery More photos of Cádiz.

 
Provinces of Andalusia